Parliamentary elections were held in Finland on 1 and 2 July 1936. Following the election Prime Minister Toivo Mikael Kivimäki of the National Progressive Party was defeated in a confidence vote in September 1936 and resigned in October. Kyösti Kallio of the Agrarian League formed a centrist minority government after Pehr Evind Svinhufvud (National Coalition Party) refused to allow the Social Democrats to join the government. After Svinhufvud's defeat in the February 1937 presidential election, Kallio took office as the new President in March 1937, and he allowed the Social Democrats, Agrarians and Progressives to form the first centre-left or "red soil" ("red" for the Social Democrats and "soil" for the Agrarians) Finnish government. Aimo Cajander (Progressive) became Prime Minister, although the real strong men of the government were Finance Minister Väinö Tanner (Social Democrat) and Defence Minister Juho Niukkanen (Agrarian).

Background
Finland had clearly recovered from the Great Depression since 1933, and unemployment had been almost eliminated. Prime Minister Kivimäki wanted to continue in office and to broaden his narrow right-wing minority government. The new Finnish economic prosperity, and the growing contacts between leading Agrarians and Social Democrats, made alternatives emerge for the Kivimäki government.  For the first time in the history of independent Finland, an Agrarian-Social Democratic government began to be seriously discussed and planned.  Despite its noisy and vigorous activity, the far-right Patriotic People's Movement remained small.  Under the leadership of Juho Kusti Paasikivi, the National Coalitioners moved towards the political centre, and rejected calls for a new electoral alliance with the Patriotic People's Movement.  The election results showed that the Finnish political democracy and its two leading moderate parties, the Social Democrats and Agrarians, had been strengthened.  The Depression-based fringe parties, the Small Farmers' Party of Finland and the People's Party, lost most of their seats, while the Patriotic People's Movement remained at fourteen deputies, and the moderate right (National Coalitioners) gained two seats.  The divided Progressives (Prime Minister Kivimäki led their right wing, and Professor Cajander led their left wing) lost four seats.

Results

References

General elections in Finland
Finland
Parliament
Election and referendum articles with incomplete results
Finland